Dysithamnus is a genus of insectivorous passerine birds in the antbird family, Thamnophilidae. Species in this genus are known as antvireos.

The genus Dysithamnus was introduced by the German ornithologist Jean Cabanis in 1847. The name combines the Ancient Greek words duō "to plunge" and thamnos "bush". The type species was subsequently designated as the spot-breasted antvireo.

The genus contains the following eight species:
 Spot-breasted antvireo, Dysithamnus stictothorax
 Plain antvireo, Dysithamnus mentalis
 Streak-crowned antvireo, Dysithamnus striaticeps
 Spot-crowned antvireo, Dysithamnus puncticeps
 Rufous-backed antvireo, Dysithamnus xanthopterus
 White-streaked antvireo, Dysithamnus leucostictus
 Plumbeous antvireo, Dysithamnus plumbeus
 Bicolored antvireo, Dysithamnus occidentalis

References

 
Bird genera
Taxonomy articles created by Polbot